Third-seeded Ann Jones defeated Nancy Richey 6–3, 6–1 in the final to win the women's singles tennis title at the 1966 French Championships.

Seeds
The seeded players are listed below. Ann Jones is the champion; others show the round in which they were eliminated.

  Margaret Smith (semifinals)
  Maria Bueno (semifinals)
  Ann Jones (champion)
  Annette Van Zyl (quarterfinals)
  Nancy Richey (finalist)
  Carole Graebner (first round)
  Judy Tegart (fourth round)
  Edda Buding (fourth round)
  Raquel Giscafré (second round)
  Françoise Dürr (quarterfinals)
  Maryna Godwin (third round)
  Helga Schultze (quarterfinals)
  Jitka Volavková (third round)
  Robyn Ebbern (first round)
  Gail Sherriff (fourth round)
  Glenda Swan (fourth round)

Draw

Key
 Q = Qualifier
 WC = Wild card
 LL = Lucky loser
 r = Retired

Finals

Earlier rounds

Section 1

Section 2

Section 3

Section 4

Section 5

Section 6

Section 7

Section 8

References

External links
   on the French Open website

1966 in women's tennis
1966
1966 in French women's sport
1966 in French tennis